|}

The Scottish Champion Hurdle is a Grade 2 National Hunt hurdle race in Britain which is open to horses aged four years or older. It is run at Ayr, South Ayrshire, over a distance of about 2 miles (3,219 metres), and during its running there are nine hurdles to be jumped. It is a limited handicap race, and it is scheduled to take place each year in April.

The event was established in 1966, and the inaugural winner was Blue Venom. For a period it was classed at Listed level, and it was promoted to Grade 2 status in 1991. The race used to be held on the day before the Scottish Grand National, but both events have taken place on the same day since 1994. Its present sponsor, CPMS, has backed the race since 2019.

Several winners of the Scottish Champion Hurdle have also achieved victory in the Champion Hurdle at the Cheltenham Festival. The most recent was Alderbrook, the winner of the latter contest in 1995. Captain Christy won the race in 1973, the year before winning the Cheltenham Gold Cup as a novice. Another Irish-trained horse, Golden Cygnet, suffered fatal injuries when he fell in the 1978 running.

Records
Most successful horse (2 wins):
 Sea Pigeon – 1977, 1978
 Birds Nest – 1979, 1981

Leading jockey (3 wins):
 Andrew Turnell – Bird's Nest (1979, 1981), Secret Ballot (1980)
 Peter Scudamore – Royal Vulcan (1983), Rushmoor (1984), Granville Again (1992)
 Richard Dunwoody – Alderbrook (1996), Blowing Wind (1998), Fadalko (1999)
 Richard Johnson – In Contrast (2003), Noble Request (2006), Cheltenian (2015)

Leading trainer (4 wins):
 Martin Pipe – Sayparee (1990), Granville Again (1992), Blowing Wind (1998), Copeland (2004)

Winners
 Weights given in stones and pounds.

See also
 Horse racing in Scotland
 List of British National Hunt races

References

 Racing Post:
 
 pedigreequery.com – Scottish Champion Hurdle – Ayr.
 

1966 establishments in Scotland
Recurring sporting events established in 1966
Ayr Racecourse
Horse racing in Scotland
National Hunt hurdle races
National Hunt races in Great Britain
Sports competitions in Scotland